The discography of English singer-songwriter Ed Sheeran consists of five studio albums, one compilation album, seventeen extended plays, one video album, sixty-five singles (including twenty-eight as a featured artist), eight promotional singles, one box set, and seventy-one music videos. As of October 2021, Sheeran has sold over 150 million records worldwide, making him one of the best-selling music artists in history. According to RIAA, Sheeran is the 13th best-selling digital singles artist in the United States with certified sales of 80.5 million. 

Originally an indie artist selling music independently on his own label starting in 2005, Sheeran released nine EPs, steadily gaining public and critical acclaim, resulting in his signing to Atlantic Records in January 2011. Five months later, Sheeran released his first single, "The A Team", on 12 June 2011. It debuted at No. 3 on the UK Singles Chart with first-week sales of 57,607 copies. The track attained international chart success, reaching the top ten in numerous countries including Australia and New Zealand, where it peaked at No. 2 and No. 3 respectively. The release was succeeded by a second single, "You Need Me, I Don't Need You", in August 2011, which peaked at No. 4 in the United Kingdom. Sheeran released his major label debut studio album, +, on 9 September 2011. In its first week, + debuted at No. 1 on the UK Albums Chart, selling over 100,000 copies in its first week and was certified 7× Platinum by the British Phonographic Industry for sales of 2.1 million copies. The album spawned a further three singles, including "Lego House", which reached the top five in Australia, New Zealand and the UK. "Drunk" was released in February 2012, becoming Sheeran's fourth consecutive top ten single when it peaked at No. 9. "Small Bump" was released in May 2012, peaking at No. 25 in the UK. The final single from +, "Give Me Love", was released on 21 November 2012 and peaked at No. 18 in the UK.

In 2014, Sheeran released his second studio album, × (Multiply), which peaked at No. 1 in the UK, Ireland, the US, Australia, New Zealand, Canada, Germany, Finland, Denmark, Switzerland and Norway. It was the fastest-selling album of 2014 in the UK, shifting 180,000 copies in its first week of release. Five singles were released from the album: "Sing", "Don't", "Thinking Out Loud", "Bloodstream" (a collaboration with Rudimental), and "Photograph". × was also the best-selling album of the year in the UK, with almost 1.7 million copies sold.

Sheeran released two singles, "Shape of You", "Castle on the Hill", his first solo material in two years, on 6 January 2017. His third studio album,  ÷, followed on 3 March 2017. It debuted at No. 1 in 14 countries, including the UK, where it sold 672,000 units in its first week to become the fastest-selling album by a male solo artist there and the third-highest opening ever (behind Adele's 25 and Oasis' Be Here Now). It also topped the charts in the US, Canada, and Australia. All the tracks on the album reached the top 20 of the UK Singles Chart in the week of the album's release, due mainly to heavy streaming. Sheeran also surpassed Calvin Harris' record of top 10 hits from one album. The next two singles, "Galway Girl" and "Perfect", both reached the summit in Ireland.

On 6 May 2021, it was announced that Sheeran became the new sponsor of the football shirt of Newhaven Town Football Club, and simultaneously revealed the title of his fourth studio album, =.

Albums

Studio albums

Compilation albums

Videos

Notes

 A The table includes positions on the music video charts, except for Germany where Jumpers entered the albums chart.

Box sets

Extended plays

Singles

As lead artist

As featured artist

Promotional singles

Other charted and certified songs

Guest appearances

Music videos

As lead artist

As featured artist

Guest appearance

Songwriting credits

Notes

References

Discography
Discographies of British artists
Folk music discographies
Pop music discographies